Whitney McClintock (born October 2, 1989) is a Canadian water skier from Cambridge, Ontario. McClintock is a five time world champion. McClintock has also won thirteen Pan American Games medals (four gold and seven silver).

Career

World Championships
McClintock has won multiple World Championships medals. In 2009 McClintock won four gold medals, in 2011 McClintock won a single gold and followed that up with two silvers in 2013.

Pan American Games
McClintock made her Pan American Games debut in 2007, where she won three medals (two gold and a silver). In 2011, McClintock won four medals (one gold and three silver). In June 2015, McClintock was named to her third Pan American Games team. At the 2015 games, McClintock again won four medals (two gold and two silver). This means McClintock has medalled in all 11 water skiing events held for women at the last three Pan American Games.

Personal life

In 2018, she married Matt Rini, a Water-skiing coach, and her stepdaughter is water skier Paige Rini.

References

External links
Whitney McClintock Rini profile at Olympic.ca

1989 births
Living people
Canadian water skiers
Sportspeople from Cambridge, Ontario
Water skiers at the 2015 Pan American Games
Pan American Games gold medalists for Canada
Pan American Games silver medalists for Canada
Pan American Games medalists in water skiing
Water skiers at the 2007 Pan American Games
Water skiers at the 2011 Pan American Games
Water skiers at the 2019 Pan American Games
Medalists at the 2007 Pan American Games
Medalists at the 2011 Pan American Games
Medalists at the 2015 Pan American Games
Medalists at the 2019 Pan American Games